Micheal Randolph Moffett, known as Randy Moffett (born January 10, 1947), is a former president of the University of Louisiana System. He was appointed to the position on July 25, 2008. He retired on the last day of 2012 and was succeeded on the first day of 2013 by Sandra Woodley.

From 2001 July to June 2008, Moffett was the president of Southeastern Louisiana University at Hammond, Louisiana.  He was succeeded there by John L. Crain.  Prior to serving as president of Southeastern, Moffett was the institutional provost and vice president for academic affairs. He also held earlier administrative roles.  After leaving his position as president of Southeastern, he was honored by a Resolution of Commendation from the University's Faculty Senate.

A native of Jonesboro in Jackson Parish, Moffett holds a bachelor's degree from Louisiana Tech University in Ruston, a master's degree from Northwestern State University in Natchitoches, and an Ed.D. in educational administration from Louisiana State University in Baton Rouge.  He is married to the former Barbara Spruill, RN, Ph.D. The couple has a son and two daughters.

Randy Moffett's role as president of ULS often placed him in the news, as in a 2009 April 17 article in the New Orleans Times-Picayune concerning funding challenges in the 2009-2010 budgets of the eight ULS campuses including Southeastern.

References 

1947 births
Living people
American Episcopalians
Presidents of the University of Louisiana campuses
Louisiana Republicans
Jonesboro-Hodge High School alumni
Louisiana State University alumni
Louisiana Tech University alumni
Northwestern State University alumni
People from Hammond, Louisiana
People from Jonesboro, Louisiana